Helen Hayes (1900–1993) was an American actress.

Helen Hayes may also refer to:
Helen Hayes (politician) (born 1974), British politician 
Helen Young Hayes, American investment fund manager

See also
Helen Haye (1874–1957), English actress
Helen Hayes Award
Helen Hays, American ornithologist
Helen Haynes, American entertainer